Lucas Oliveira de França  (born 19 January 1996), known as Lucas França, is a Brazilian professional footballer who plays for Portuguese club Nacional as a goalkeeper.

Professional career
França arrived at Cruzeiro in 2011. He had a standout career at Cruzeiro's youth teams. In 2016, he was the fourth goalkeeper at Cruzeiro; however, due to a series of events, he became the first goalkeeper, making his professional debut on August 8, 2016 in a match against Corinthians for the Campeonato Brasileiro.

References

External links
Cruzeiro profile 

1996 births
Footballers from São Paulo
Living people
Brazilian footballers
Association football goalkeepers
Cruzeiro Esporte Clube players
C.D. Nacional players
Ceará Sporting Club players
Guarani FC players
Campeonato Brasileiro Série A players
Campeonato Brasileiro Série B players
Primeira Liga players
Brazilian expatriate footballers
Brazilian expatriate sportspeople in Portugal
Expatriate footballers in Portugal